Scoliciosporum is a genus of lichens in the family Scoliciosporaceae.

Taxonomy
The genus was reinstated by Antonin Vězda in 1978 to contain crustose lichens with immarginate apothecia, gelatinized, branched and anastomosing paraphyses, eight-spored, usually Lecanora-type asci, and hyaline, multi-septate ascospores.

Scoliciosporum was originally placed in the family Micareaceae by Josef Poelt in 1974. This classification was rejected after the appearance of molecular phylogenetic studies in the mid-2000s.

Habitat and distribution
Scoliciosporum species grow mainly on bark, stones and leaves. They occur mostly in temperate locales.

Species
Scoliciosporum abietinum 
Scoliciosporum arachnoideum  – Madagascar
Scoliciosporum camptosporum 
Scoliciosporum chlorococcum 
Scoliciosporum coniectum 
Scoliciosporum curvatum 
Scoliciosporum fabisporum  – South Africa
Scoliciosporum holomelaenum 
Scoliciosporum intrusum 
Scoliciosporum jasonhurii 
Scoliciosporum pensylvanicum 
Scoliciosporum pruinosum 
Scoliciosporum sarothamni 
Scoliciosporum umbrinum 
Scoliciosporum vouauxii

References

Lecanorales genera
Lecanorales
Lichen genera
Taxa named by Abramo Bartolommeo Massalongo
Taxa described in 1852